Shahjerpur is a village near Phulpur, Azamgarh in the Azamgarh district, which is in the state of Uttar Pradesh, India.

References

Villages in Azamgarh district